Masonia (The name meaning 'Builders of music'), is a five-piece rock band hailing from Sydney, Australia. Also known as the band Blind Verdict. Their debut single reached #41 on the ARIA singles chart, reaching #26 in NSW. The lead singer of the band, Altiyan Childs, auditioned for the first Australian season of The X Factor in 2010 and has since made it through to the finals and won. The keyboard player / backing vocalist Daniel Rivers has since moved on to producing Soul/R&B/Hip-Hop music under the name 'Dans Pies'. The bass player / backing vocalist Moe Bloomfield is currently playing in The Deer Republic who recently won the 2009 Tooheys Extra Dry UncharTED competition.

Members
 Altiyan Childs (vocals, guitar) - Real name Altiyan Juric (original member)
 Daniel Rivers (keys, backing vocals) - Also known as musician Dans Pies (original member)
 Moe Bloomfield (bass, backing vocals) - Currently plays bass for The Deer Republic (original member)
 Kris Petersen / Danul Stewart (guitar, backing vocals)
 Dane Charles / Nathan Merryment / Frank Colaiacolo / Hugh Cook (drums)

Discography
Albums
 World On Fire (2005)

EPs
 Anywhere with You (2006)

Singles
 "Simple" (2004) – AUS No. 41
 "Dream" (2007)

References

External links
 MySpace Page

Australian rock music groups